Chloronia is a genus of dobsonflies in the family Corydalidae.

Description 
Chloronia is one of the three New World dobsonfly genera, the other two being Platyneuromus and Corydalus. Chloronia are easily distinguished by their bright yellow coloration with black spots and are present from Northern Mexico south to Eastern South America. Chloronia frequently inhabit the same streams as Corydalus but prefer slower moving waters. Their larvae are distinguishable by their dark head and four dark spots on their pronotum.

Taxonomy 
Chloronia contains the following species:

 Chloronia absona
 Chloronia antilliensis
 Chloronia banksiana
 Chloronia bogotana
 Chloronia convergens
 Chloronia corripiens
 Chloronia gaianii
 Chloronia gloriosoi
 Chloronia hieroglyphica
 Chloronia marthae
 Chloronia mexicana
 Chloronia mirifica
 Chloronia osae
 Chloronia pallida
 Chloronia pennyi
 Chloronia plaumanni
 Chloronia yungas
 Chloronia zacapa

References 

Corydalidae